Malwepe (also Lepérousel Island) is a small uninhabited island in Sanma Province of Vanuatu in the Pacific Ocean.

Geography
Malwepe lies off the eastern coast of Espiritu Santo. The estimated terrain elevation above sea level is 16 metres. The island has light vegetation and many coconut trees.

References

Islands of Vanuatu
Sanma Province
Uninhabited islands of Vanuatu